The following outline is provided as an overview of and topical guide to Equatorial Guinea:

Equatorial Guinea – sovereign country located on the Gulf of Guinea in Middle Africa.  It is one of the smallest countries in continental Africa, and comprises two regions: Río Muni, continental region including several offshore islands; and
Insular Region containing Annobón island in the South Atlantic Ocean, and Bioko island (formerly Fernando Po) that contains the capital, Malabo.

General reference

 Pronunciation: 
 Common English country name: Equatorial Guinea
 Official English country name: The Republic of Equatorial Guinea
 Common endonym(s): Guinea Ecuatorial  
 Official endonym(s): República de Guinea Ecuatorial  
 Adjectives: Equatorial Guinean,  Equatoguinean
 Demonym(s):
 International rankings of Equatorial Guinea
 ISO country codes: GQ, GNQ, 226
 ISO region codes: See ISO 3166-2:GQ
 Internet country code top-level domain: .gq

Geography

Geography of Equatorial Guinea
 Equatorial Guinea is: a country
 Location:
 Northern Hemisphere and Eastern Hemisphere
 Africa
 Central Africa
 Time zone:  West Africa Time (UTC+01)
 Extreme points of Equatorial Guinea
 High:  Pico Basile 
 Low:  North Atlantic Ocean 0 m
 Land boundaries:  539 km
 350 km
 189 km
 Coastline:  Gulf of Guinea 296 km
 Population of Equatorial Guinea: 507,000  - 164th most populous country

 Area of Equatorial Guinea: 28,051 km2
 Atlas of Equatorial Guinea

Environment

 Climate of Equatorial Guinea
 Ecoregions in Equatorial Guinea
 Geology of Equatorial Guinea
 Wildlife of Equatorial Guinea
 Fauna of Equatorial Guinea
 Birds of Equatorial Guinea
 Mammals of Equatorial Guinea

Natural geographic features

 Glaciers in Equatorial Guinea: none 
 Islands of Equatorial Guinea
 Mountains of Equatorial Guinea
 Volcanoes in Equatorial Guinea
 Rivers of Equatorial Guinea
 World Heritage Sites in Equatorial Guinea: None

Regions

Regions of Equatorial Guinea

Ecoregions

List of ecoregions in Equatorial Guinea

Administrative divisions

Administrative divisions of Equatorial Guinea
 Provinces of Equatorial Guinea

Provinces

Provinces of Equatorial Guinea

Municipalities

 Capital of Equatorial Guinea: Malabo
 Cities of Equatorial Guinea

Demography

Demographics of Equatorial Guinea

Government and politics

Politics of Equatorial Guinea
 Form of government: presidential republic
 Capital of Equatorial Guinea: Malabo
 Elections in Equatorial Guinea
 Political parties in Equatorial Guinea

Branches of the government

Government of Equatorial Guinea

Executive branch
 Head of state: President of Equatorial Guinea,
 Head of government: Prime Minister of Equatorial Guinea,

Legislative branch
 Parliament of Equatorial Guinea (bicameral)
 Upper house: Senate of Equatorial Guinea
 Lower house: House of Commons of Equatorial Guinea

Judicial branch

Court system of Equatorial Guinea

Foreign relations

Foreign relations of Equatorial Guinea
 Diplomatic missions in Equatorial Guinea
 Diplomatic missions of Equatorial Guinea

International organization membership 
The Republic of Equatorial Guinea is a member of:

African, Caribbean, and Pacific Group of States (ACP)
African Development Bank Group (AfDB)
African Union (AU)
Comunidade dos Países de Língua Portuguesa (CPLP) (associate)
Conference des Ministres des Finances des Pays de la Zone Franc (FZ)
Development Bank of Central African States (BDEAC)
Economic and Monetary Community of Central Africa (CEMAC)
Food and Agriculture Organization (FAO)
Group of 77 (G77)
International Bank for Reconstruction and Development (IBRD)
International Civil Aviation Organization (ICAO)
International Criminal Police Organization (Interpol)
International Development Association (IDA)
International Federation of Red Cross and Red Crescent Societies (IFRCS)
International Finance Corporation (IFC)
International Fund for Agricultural Development (IFAD)
International Labour Organization (ILO)
International Maritime Organization (IMO)
International Monetary Fund (IMF)

International Olympic Committee (IOC)
International Red Cross and Red Crescent Movement (ICRM)
International Telecommunication Union (ITU)
International Telecommunications Satellite Organization (ITSO)
Multilateral Investment Guarantee Agency (MIGA)
Nonaligned Movement (NAM)
Organisation internationale de la Francophonie (OIF)
Organisation for the Prohibition of Chemical Weapons (OPCW)
Organization of American States (OAS) (observer)
United Nations (UN)
United Nations Conference on Trade and Development (UNCTAD)
United Nations Educational, Scientific, and Cultural Organization (UNESCO)
United Nations Industrial Development Organization (UNIDO)
Universal Postal Union (UPU)
World Federation of Trade Unions (WFTU)
World Health Organization (WHO)
World Intellectual Property Organization (WIPO)
World Tourism Organization (UNWTO)
World Trade Organization (WTO) (observer)

Law and order

Law of Equatorial Guinea
 Constitution of Equatorial Guinea
 Human rights in Equatorial Guinea
 LGBT rights in Equatorial Guinea
Law Enforcement in Equatorial Guinea 
Equatorial Guinean National Police 
National Gendermeries

Military

Military of Equatorial Guinea
 Command
 Commander-in-chief:
 Forces
 Army of Equatorial Guinea
 Navy of Equatorial Guinea
 Air Force of Equatorial Guinea

Local government

Local government in Equatorial Guinea

History

History of Equatorial Guinea
Current events of Equatorial Guinea

History by subject 
History of rail transport in Equatorial Guinea
Postage stamps and postal history of Equatorial Guinea

Culture

Culture of Equatorial Guinea
 Cuisine of Equatorial Guinea
 Languages of Equatorial Guinea
 Media in Equatorial Guinea
 National symbols of Equatorial Guinea
 Coat of arms of Equatorial Guinea
 Flag of Equatorial Guinea
 National anthem of Equatorial Guinea
 People of Equatorial Guinea
 Public holidays in Equatorial Guinea
 Religion in Equatorial Guinea
 Christianity in Equatorial Guinea
 Hinduism in Equatorial Guinea
 Islam in Equatorial Guinea
 Sikhism in Equatorial Guinea
 World Heritage Sites in Equatorial Guinea: None

Art
 Music of Equatorial Guinea

Sports

Sport in Equatorial Guinea
 Football in Equatorial Guinea
 Equatorial Guinea at the Olympics

Economy and infrastructure 

Economy of Equatorial Guinea
 Economic rank, by nominal GDP (2007): 115th (one hundred and fifteenth)
 Agriculture in Equatorial Guinea
 Communications in Equatorial Guinea
 Internet in Equatorial Guinea
 Companies of Equatorial Guinea
Currency of Equatorial Guinea: Franc
ISO 4217: XAF
 Energy in Equatorial Guinea
 Health care in Equatorial Guinea
 Mining in Equatorial Guinea
 Tourism in Equatorial Guinea
 Transport in Equatorial Guinea
 Airports in Equatorial Guinea
 Rail transport in Equatorial Guinea

Education

Education in Equatorial Guinea

Health in Equatorial Guinea 

Health in Equatorial Guinea

See also 

Equatorial Guinea

Index of Equatorial Guinea–related articles
List of Equatorial Guinea-related topics
List of international rankings
Member state of the United Nations
Outline of Africa
Outline of geography

References

External links

Equatorial Guinea
Equatorial Guinea